The Scientific Studies and Research Center (SSRC), better known by its French name Centre D'Etudes et de Recherches Scientifiques (CERS), is a Syrian government agency that has the goal of advancing and coordinating scientific activities in the country. It works on research and development for the economic and social development of Syria, especially the computerization of government agencies. It is considered to have better technical capacity and equipment than the Syrian universities. Jane's Information Group Intelligence Services and other analysts believe it is responsible for research and development of nuclear, biological, chemical and missile technology and weapons, including ballistic missiles, as well as advanced conventional arms.

CERS is run by a director-general with the rank of minister, who is directly responsible to the president. It provides most research and development functions for the Syrian military. Since the 1970s, CERS has also been responsible for the development of civilian science and technology in Syria, and it was on this basis that CERS was able to develop cooperative relationships with Western chemical companies.

History
SSRC was established in 1971, following a presidential directive in 1969. Its first director-general was Abdullah Watiq Shahid, a nuclear physicist who had become the minister of higher education in 1967. SSRC was ostensibly a civilian agency but Shahid's aim was to pursue weapons development. In 1973 President Hafez al-Assad authorized relations between SSRC and the Syrian Army. SSRC then became the main agency for development and enhancement of weapons for the army. While it remained ostensibly civilian, Ziauddin Sardar's 1982 book Science and Technology in the Middle East said SSRC "belongs to the Syrian defense ministry, and conducts military research."

In 1983 the military chief of staff was made responsible for appointing members of SSRC's board and technical staff. The military was also to authorize all appointments in SSRC's new branch for applied science, the Higher Institute for Applied Sciences and Technology (HIAST). The SSRC director-general was raised to ministerial rank. The production of chemical weapons became one of SSRC's main projects. News media have reported production plants for sarin, VX and mustard gas near Damascus, Hama, Homs, Aleppo and Latakia. Some or all of the plants were established ostensibly as civilian facilities.

Western intelligence agencies believe that the Syrian procurement structure for biological and chemical weapons uses SSRC as cover. The center has received the required expertise, technology and materials from Russian sources to produce VX nerve gas.

In June 1996 the CIA had discovered that SSRC received a shipment of missile components from China Precision Machinery Import-Export Corporation as part as a wider collaboration between the two institutions.

According to French intelligence, SSRC is responsible for producing toxic agents for use in war. A group named "Branch 450" is allegedly responsible for filling munitions with chemicals and maintaining security of the chemical agent stockpiles.

In June 2020, it was reported that SSRC has been seeking to procure illicit nuclear, biological and chemical weapons of mass destruction technology in southern Germany. In one reported case, it procured laboratory equipment from a company in North Baden, which was to be forwarded to Syria via Lebanon and China.

Military activities

Development of chemical weapons 
According to US intelligence reports, in August 2013, SSRC prepared chemical munitions used for deadly chemical attacks which killed hundreds of Syrian civilians in the Syrian Civil War.

According to French intelligence, SSRC is responsible for producing toxic agents for use in war, pinpointing "Branch 450" as being responsible for filling munitions with chemicals and also the security of sites where the chemical agents are stocked.

Sanctions 
In 2005, US president George W. Bush issued Executive Order 13382, "Blocking Property of Weapons of Mass Destruction Proliferators and their Supporters," which prohibited U.S. citizens and residents from doing business with SSRC. In 2007 the US Treasury banned trade with three SSRC subsidiaries: the Higher Institute of Applied Science and Technology (HIAST), the Electronics Institute, and the National Standards and Calibration Laboratory (NSCL).

On 24 April 2017, weeks after the 2017 Khan Shaykhun chemical attack, the United States Department of the Treasury imposed sanctions on 271 SSRC employees for their alleged role in producing chemical weapons.

Military actions 
In 2010, Nitzan Nuriel, the director of the Israel's Counter-Terrorism Bureau, said that SSRC had transferred weapons to Hamas and Hezbollah and that the international community should warn the Syrian government that SSRC would be demolished if it continued to arm terrorist organizations.

On 31 January 2013, one of SSRC's facilities, located at Jamraya, was damaged by an Israeli airstrike which was believed to be targeting a convoy carrying advanced anti-aircraft weaponry from SSRC to the Lebanese Shiite militia Hezbollah.

In September 2017 the Israel Defense Forces bombed a SSRC military research facility near Masyaf, probably targeting an advanced missiles factory. Two Syrian soldiers were killed and the facility was severely damaged, with many weapons stored inside destroyed. Syrian media reported another Israeli attack in December 2017.

On 14 April 2018, several buildings alleged to be associated with the Syrian chemical weapons programme at SSRC's facility at Barzah in Damascus were destroyed during US missile strikes on chemical weapons sites. Other buildings within the larger complex were undamaged.

In August 2018, Aziz Azbar, the head of SSRC in Masyaf at the time, was assassinated in a car bombing, allegedly by Israel.

On 29 February 2020, Turkish drone strikes bombed the SSRG site in As-Safira. A Turkish official claimed the site was used to develop chemical weapons.

On 24 December 2020, an Israeli airstrike near Masyaf destroyed four missile production facilities. The attack reportedly killed six people and destroyed depots and missile production facilities belonging to Iranian militias.

See also
 Barzah scientific research centre
 Syria and weapons of mass destruction
 Syrian Civil War

References

Military of Syria
Research institutes in Syria
Chemical weapons in the Syrian civil war